Kani Miran (also Romanized as Kānī Mīrān; also known as Kān Mīrān) is a village in Kani Bazar Rural District, Khalifan District, Mahabad County, West Azerbaijan Province, Iran. At the 2006 census, its population was 125, in 20 families.

References 

Populated places in Mahabad County